The Nicaragua women's national under-18 and under-19 basketball team is a national basketball team of Nicaragua, managed by the Federación Nicaraguense de Baloncesto.

It represents the country in international under-18 and under-19 (under age 18 and under age 19) women's basketball competitions.

It appeared at the 2005 COCABA U19 Championship for Women.

References

External links
Archived records of Nicaragua team participations

Basketball in Nicaragua
Basketball teams in Nicaragua
Women's national under-19 basketball teams
Basketball